Hayley Ovens (born 5 December 1975) is a British retired athlete who competed in the 400m, 800m, 1500m and 3000m. She was a finalist in the 2002 Commonwealth Games in Manchester where she finished in 12th place. In 2003, she competed for Great Britain and Northern Ireland in the World Indoor Championships, exiting at the semi-final stage. In 2006, she was a finalist in the 1500m at the Melbourne Commonwealth Games, finishing 10th. She is a multiple Scottish and UK Champion both indoors and out. Her personal best for the 1500m is 4:10:34 and for the 800m is 2:03:19.

Ovens retired from competitive athletics in 2006.

References

External links 
 

1975 births
Living people
Scottish female athletes
Scottish female middle-distance runners
British female middle-distance runners
Commonwealth Games competitors for Scotland
Athletes (track and field) at the 2002 Commonwealth Games
Athletes (track and field) at the 2006 Commonwealth Games
Sportspeople from Edinburgh